Robert Stanton Greenwood, Jr. (born October 27, 1938) is an American professional golfer who played on the PGA Tour from 1969 to 1975. He is a PGA of America Life Member.

Greenwood was born in Cookeville, Tennessee. Prior to his professional career, he was thrice ranked in the Top Ten Amateurs in the United States by Golf Magazine and Golf Digest. He was a three-time NCAA-All American at North Texas State University and was inducted into University of North Texas Sports Hall of Fame on November 2, 2002 in Denton, Texas. He was inducted into the Tennessee Golf Hall of Fame on September 5, 2007 at Holston Hills Country Club in Knoxville, Tennessee. He was inducted as a charter member of the Riverside Military Academy Centennial All-Sports Hall of Fame on October 13, 2007 in Gainesville, Georgia where he was the leading scorer on the basketball team and he hit ten home runs on the RMA baseball team. 

After a stellar amateur career which included winning over 150 amateur and pro tournaments, Greenwood turned pro in 1969 and won his card for the PGA Tour, tying for 3rd place in the qualifying tournament. He played the PGA Tour for seven years winning the Rhode Island Open. After leaving the PGA Tour in 1975, Greenwood was Director of Golf at Sawgrass Country Club in Ponte Vedra Beach, Florida, 1977 and 1978. (Home of the Tournament Players Championship, now called The Players). A PGA of America Life Member, Greenwood also received the Tennessee 2007 PGA Distinguished Career Award and 2005 PGA President's Council Award. Greenwood is now a golf course architect out of his hometown, Cookeville, Tennessee.

Golf credits

Awards and honors
2010 Tennessee PGA Distinguished Career Award (retroactive 2007)
2007 Tennessee Golf Hall of Fame 
2007 Riverside Military Academy Centennial Sports Hall of Fame (Charter Member)
2005 PGA President's Council Award
2002 University of North Texas Athletic Hall of Fame

College golf career
1964 Member of the Prestigious Ten-Man Texas Cup Team, Dallas, Texas. 
1963 NCAA All-America - First Team, North Texas State University, Denton, Texas.
1963 Runner-up Finish, Missouri Valley Conference Golf League Championship (Peoria, Illinois).
1963 Member, NCAA Championship North-South All-Star Matches 
1963 Southern Intercollegiate Conference (S.I.C.) Champion, Athens, Georgia.
1963 All-American Intercollegiate, hosted by University of Houston at Pine Forest Country Club, Houston, Texas. (Runner-up to Kermit Zarley)
1962 NCAA All-America - Second Team, North Texas State University, Denton, Texas.
1962 Runner-up, Missouri Valley Conference Golf League Championship (Peoria, Illinois).
1962 Border Olympics Golf Tournament, Laredo, Texas. (Finished 4th place). 
1962 Dick Smith Memorial Award for Outstanding College Golfer, North Texas State University, Denton, Texas.
1961 NCAA All-America - Honorable Mention, North Texas State University, Denton, Texas.
1961 Runner-up, Missouri Valley Conference Golf League Championship (Rolling Hills Country Club, Tulsa, Oklahoma).
1961 Colonial Invitational, Colonial Country Club, Memphis, Tennessee. (defeated Jack Nicklaus, 1 up in 19 holes, sudden death playoff, 9 months before Jack won the U.S. Open).
1961 Southwest Recreational Intercollegiate Champion, Fort Worth, Texas.
1958 Runner-up, Ohio Valley Conference Golf League Championship. (This was the first of 4 Conference runner-up finishes: 1 in the Ohio Valley Conference and 3 in the Missouri Valley Conference). 
1958 Champion, T.I.A.C., Tennessee Technological University, Cookeville, Tennessee.

Amateur career
1964 Co-medalist U.S. Amateur, Canterbury Country Club, Cleveland, Ohio.
Qualified & played in four U.S. Amateurs.
Qualified and played in two U.S. Opens.
1963 Texas Cup Team (Ten-member team) (defeated Byron Nelson in singles match.)
1968 Tennessee Cup Team. (After competing in the 10-member Texas Cup Team in 1963, Greenwood brought the idea and concept to his home State of Tennessee where he was co-founder and selected the entire amateur team for the inaugural event in 1968 which was held at Old Hickory Country Club.)  
Top 10 Amateurs in U.S. by Golf Magazine, twice (ranked 6th and 8th respectively).
Top 10 Amateurs in U.S. by Golf Digest, 1968 (ranked 7th. His ranking was based on a victory in the Sunnehanna as well as the Tennessee State Open and his finished third in the Southern Amateur.)
1965 Sunnehanna Amateur Champion, Johnstown, Pennsylvania. (Tournament record of 269 set in 1965 and current course record of 63 set in second round in 1965).
1966 Tennessee Amateur Champion, Chickasaw Country Club, Memphis, Tennessee.
1968 Sunnehanna Amateur Champion, Johnstown, Pennsylvania.
1968 Southern Amateur Championship, finished 3rd, Lost Tree Village Golf Course, North Palm Beach, Florida. [Set course record 64 (-8), later tied by Calvin Peete) Jack Nicklaus Home Course.]
1968 Tennessee Open Champion, Old Hickory Country Club, Nashville, Tennessee. (won by 8 strokes, -8 par).
Irvin Cobb Open Championship, Paducah, Kentucky (Two-time Winner)

PGA Tour and Champions Tour career
1969 Attended PGA Tour Qualifying School, Palm Beach Gardens, Florida (tied for 3rd place).
1969 "Champions' Choice" - PGA Tour rookie. (Chosen to play in the Colonial Invitational (NIT) voted by past champions. Fort Worth, Texas.) 
1969-1975 PGA Tour Player for seven years.
1970 Rhode Island Open Champion, Agawan Hunt & Golf Club, Rhode Island. (Satellite event of the PGA Tour).
1971 PGA Member - Class A.
1972-1975 Tournament Players Division - PGA Tour. (Voting member).
Made 72 cuts, six top-10 finishes, and 15 top-25s on the PGA Tour.
1988-1991 Champions (Senior PGA) Tour - six events

Golf professional playing career
1968, 1976, 1991, 1992, 1993, 1994, 1999, 2000 - Tennessee Cup Team.
1977-1978 - Director of Golf & Host Pro of The Tournament Players Championship (now The Players Championship), Sawgrass Country Club, Ponte Vedra Beach, Florida.
1991, 1992, 1994 - Tennessee Senior PGA Champion.
1999 Tri-Cities Fall Pro-Am, Senior Champion (75-70=145), Bristol, Virginia.
Winner of over 150 amateur and pro tournaments in playing career.

See also
Spring 1969 PGA Tour Qualifying School graduates

External links

 GreenwoodPGA.net
 Official Blog of Bobby Greenwood, PGA
 Tennessee Golf Hall of Fame
 Southern Golf Association
 Golf Coaches Association of America
 The North Texan
 Sunnehanna Amateur Champions
 Porter Cup
 TheGolfCourses.net
 Tennessee Golf Association
 If You Like Golf
 Database Golf
 PGA Pro-finder
 Bobby Greenwood, PGA's Official Facebook Page 

American male golfers
North Texas Mean Green men's golfers
PGA Tour golfers
Golfers from Tennessee
People from Cookeville, Tennessee
1938 births
Living people